Waterloo Catholic District School Board (WCDSB) is a school board serving the Region of Waterloo, Ontario, Canada. It is headquartered in Kitchener, and is currently the eighth-largest Catholic school system in Ontario.

As of November 2023, this Board operated 43 elementary schools, five secondary schools and five adult and continuing education campuses served by 4,200 full and part-time staff (including teachers, educational assistants, support staff, custodial staff, youth care workers, administrators, and supply staff). The total enrolment was 25,700, plus 13,000 students in adult/continuing education programs.

History

What was to become the Waterloo Catholic District School Board began in 1836 in a log building in St. Agatha, Ontario used by both public and Catholic students. A permanent stone building was erected in 1854, and a second school was also built in 1836 in New Germany (now Maryhill, Ontario). The next Catholic school to be built was in St. Clements, Ontario and opened in 1840 in Preston (now Cambridge, Ontario).

St. Jerome High School, then called a College, was founded in 1865 by Reverend Dr. Louis Funcken and his brother Fr. Eugene Funcken, Fathers of the Congregation of the Resurrection. The first location was a log cabin in St. Agatha but by 1867, the school moved to Duke St. in Kitchener. Initially, its role was to prepare young men for the seminary. This school closed permanently in 1990.

By 1907, the local area had 6 Catholic Schools (including a Catholic girls' convent school.) The original schools were centred in the areas of Berlin (now Kitchener), and Preston (now Cambridge.)

With the passage of the British North America Act in 1867, which guaranteed Roman Catholics in Ontario the right to their own Catholic schools, these schools would later extend into all of the Waterloo County. For many years, the teaching staff came from among the Religious – particularly Religious Sisters. Today, hiring is carried out following Ontario legislation. Full funding to the Catholic school system began in 1984.

By 1968, independent Catholic School Boards were operating in Kitchener, Waterloo, Galt, Preston, Hespeler, Bridgeport, New Hamburg, Maryhill, St. Agatha, Linwood, Elmira and St. Clements. These independent Boards all ceased to exist on January 1, 1969, when the Ontario Legislature amalgamated them into one Board – the Waterloo County Separate School Board.

In 1997, the Waterloo County Separate School Board ceased to exist as a result of a second provincial amalgamation effort. The Waterloo Catholic District School Board was incorporated in 1998 through the Education Act to oversee Catholic schools in the cities of Cambridge, Kitchener, and Waterloo, and the townships of Wilmot, Woolwich, North Dumfries, and Wellesley.

In early 2018, the Board indicated that enrolment was increasing more rapidly in the past four years than in previous years. Between 2005 and 2014, enrolment grew by 2%. Since 2014 however, full-time enrolment had increased from 19,718 to approximately 22,088 students. An estimate at the time indicated that roughly one in three students in the Region are educated by the Catholic Board.

On June 1, 2021, the Board raised the Pride flag for the first time at the board office and at all schools for June to celebrate LGBT Pride Month. A second flag pole was installed in the months leading up to June for schools that only had a single flag pole, so that the Pride Flag and Canadian Flag could be flown simultaneously. The decision to fly the Pride Flag resulted in two trustees resigning, those being Greig Reitzel and Kevin Dupuis. Both trustees had previously threatened to resign if the board decided to fly the Pride Flag.

Secondary Schools
Monsignor Doyle Catholic Secondary School, Cambridge 
Resurrection Catholic Secondary School, Kitchener 
St. Benedict Catholic Secondary School, Cambridge
St. David Catholic Secondary School, Waterloo 
St. Mary's High School, Kitchener

See also
List of school districts in Ontario
List of high schools in Ontario
List of Waterloo Region, Ontario schools
Public Education in Canada

References

 
Educational institutions with year of establishment missing